The attorney general of New York is the chief legal officer of the U.S. state of New York and head of the Department of Law of the state government. The office has been in existence in some form since 1626, under the Dutch colonial government of New Netherland. The attorney general of the State of New York is the highest-paid state attorney general in the country.

Democrat Letitia James currently serves as attorney general, in office since January 1, 2019.

Functions
The attorney general advises the executive branch of state government and defends actions and proceedings on behalf of the state. The attorney general acts independently of the governor of New York. The department's regulations are compiled in title 13 of the New York Codes, Rules and Regulations (NYCRR).

Organization
The legal functions of the Department of Law are divided primarily into five major divisions: Appeals and Opinions, State Counsel, Criminal Justice, Economic Justice and Social Justice.

Chief deputy attorney general
 Harlan Levy (2011–2015)

Solicitor general
 Ruth Kessler Toch (1966–1979)
 Shirley Adelson Siegel (1979–1982)
 Robert Hermann (1983–1986)
 O. Peter Sherwood (1986–1991)
 Jerry Boone (1991–1994)
 Victoria A. Graffeo (1995–1996)
 Barbara Gott Billet (1996–1998)
 Preeta D. Bansal (1999–2001)
 Caitlin Halligan (2001–2007)
 Barbara D. Underwood (2007–present)

Terms of office
 From 1684 to 1777, when New York was under the British colonial government, the attorney general was appointed by the British crown, or the colonial governor on its behalf. In 1693, the attorney general earned a salary of 50 pounds.
 From 1777 to 1822, the attorney general was appointed by the Council of Appointment.
 From 1823 to 1846, the attorney general was elected by the New York State Legislature for a three-year term.
 Attorneys general have been elected by the voters since 1847.

List of attorneys general of New York

Province of New York (1684–1776)

New York State (1777–present)

See also
 New York Attorney General elections

References

External links
 
 Department of Law in the New York Codes, Rules and Regulations
 New York Attorney General articles at ABA Journal
 News and Commentary at FindLaw
 New York Consolidated Laws at Law.Justia.com
 U.S. Supreme Court Opinions - "Cases with title containing: State of New York" at FindLaw
 New York State Bar Association
 Press releases at New York Attorney General

 
1626 establishments in the Dutch Empire